There have been 32 vice presidents of Colombia since the position was first created in 1819. The position has been created interspersed in the different constitutions of the country.
 
The vice president is the first person in the line of presidential succession and assumes the presidency if the president dies, resigns, or is impeached and removed from office. A single vice president has ascended to the presidency in this way: only one through the death of the president (Miguel Antonio Caro) Vice presidents have wielded the latter power to varying degrees over the years.

Under the Colombian Constitution of 1991, the Vice President of Colombia is the first in the Presidential line of Succession of the Republic of Colombia. In absence of both the president and the vice president, Article 203 of the Constitution of 1991 establishes that the presidential office will be assumed by a minister in the order of precedence established by law. The assuming minister has to be a member of the same party or movement the original president belonged to, and will exercise the presidency until the Congress, within the 30 days following the presidential vacancy, elects a new vice president who will assume the presidency.

Vice presidents of the independent states

State of Antioquia

State of Cundinamarca

State of Cartagena de Indias

Vice presidents of the United Provinces of New Granada (1812–1816)

Vice presidents of the Republic of Gran Colombia (1819–1831)

Vice presidents of the departments
Upon creation of the Gran Colombia, Congress divided the country into three departments and appointed a "Vice President" to each one. These vice presidents were more like governors of their department however, and there was no "President" for every department. so it was:
 Francisco de Paula Santander y Omaña, Vice President of the Department of Cundinamarca.
 Juan Germán Roscio Nieves, Vice President of the Department of Venezuela.
 Office vacant, Vice President of the Department of Quito.

The office of Vice President of Quito was left vacant since it was still under Spanish rule, but once it was liberated the office was never filled either.

Vice presidents of the Republic

Vice presidents of the Republic of New Granada (1831–1858)

Vice presidents of Granadine Confederation (1858–1863)
Abolished

Vice presidents of the United States of Colombia (1863–1886)
Abolished

Vice presidents of the Republic of Colombia (1886–present)

See also
 List of viceroys of New Granada
 List of presidential designates of Colombia
 List of presidents of Colombia

References

External links
 Biblioteca Luis Angel Arango – Lista de Vice Presidentes

Vice Presidents